The Tajikistan national under-20 football team is a national association football youth team of Tajikistan and is controlled by the Tajikistan Football Federation and represents Tajikistan in international under-20 football competitions.

Tournament records

FIFA U-20 World Cup

 2006 AFC Youth Championship
 2008 AFC U-19 Championship
 2016 AFC U-19 Championship

Results and fixtures

Current squad
 The following 23 players were called up for the 2016 AFC U-19 Championship:
 Caps and goals are correct as of October 20, 2016, after the match against .
 Caps and goals are correct excluding friendly matches and unrecognized tournaments such as Arab U-20 Championship.

Recent squad

References

External links
 Tajikistan Football Federation
 
 

under-20
Asian national under-20 association football teams